The 1904 West Cavan by-election was a parliamentary by-election held for the United Kingdom House of Commons constituency of West Cavan on 11 June 1904. The election was caused by the death of the sitting member, Thomas McGovern) of the Irish Parliamentary Party. Only one candidate was nominated, Vincent Kennedy of the Irish Parliamentary Party, who was therefore elected unopposed.

References

1904 elections in the United Kingdom
June 1904 events
By-elections to the Parliament of the United Kingdom in County Cavan constituencies
Unopposed by-elections to the Parliament of the United Kingdom in Irish constituencies
1904 elections in Ireland